The Anguilla Democratic Party was a political party in Anguilla. 
At the 21 February 2005 elections, the party first became part of the Anguilla United Front, which won 38.9% of popular votes and  four out of seven elected seats.

Electoral results

External links
Official web site Anguilla United Front

Political parties in Anguilla
Conservative parties in British Overseas Territories